The Ayr by-election on 16 March 2000 was the first by-election for the Scottish Parliament that had been established the year previously.  It was caused by the resignation of Ian Welsh who had been elected at the 1999 Scottish Parliament election. Welsh resigned to spend more time with his family.

The by-election came amidst the Keep the Clause campaign. The Scottish parliament seat of Ayr shared its boundaries with the Westminster seat, which had until 1997 been held by the Conservatives for almost a hundred years. In the 1999 Scottish parliamentary election the seat had been the most marginal in Scotland, with Labour winning over the Conservatives by a mere 25 votes. The Keep the Clause Campaign sought to influence the outcome of the election, campaigning in the area and buying up billboard space. Souter later claimed to have successfully influenced the by-election, with the by-election being won by the Conservative candidate, who had opposed repealing Section 28. Labour's George Foulkes attacked the Keep the Clause Campaign, claiming there had been a "distortion of democracy" and that the Keep the Clause Campaign had outspent all the candidates combined.

The result was a poor one for the Scottish Labour, which had won the seat in the previous year, albeit with a majority of just 25. Labour fell into third place behind the Scottish National Party (SNP) and the Scottish Conservatives. The Scottish Socialist Party had a relatively strong performance for a constituency which did not seem like its natural terrain.

This by-election showed a strange effect in the Scottish AMS electoral system. Labour in the South of Scotland region had won seven seats, all as first past the post constituencies and none on the list system through proportional representation, whilst the Conservative and Unionists had won four seats in South of Scotland through the proportional representation system. By winning the Ayr seat at the by-election the Conservatives had technically greater representation than their 1999 results would have proportionally given them. This is an anomaly that the Scotland Act 1998 does not cater to.

Result

Previous result

See also
 Ayr (Scottish Parliament constituency)
 Ayr (UK Parliament constituency)
 Elections in Scotland
 List of by-elections to the Scottish Parliament

References

External links
Scottish Election Results 1997 - present

Ayr by-election
Ayr by-election
2000s elections in Scotland
Ayr 2000
Politics of South Ayrshire
20th century in South Ayrshire
Ayr by-election